The Sender Inselsberg (transmitter Inselsberg) is an FM and television-transmission facility on the Großer Inselsberg in Thuringia, Germany. It has two aerial towers, which were built in 1939 and 1974.

The transmission tower built in 1939 is a  freestanding cylindrical tower built of steel concrete, which carried until the beginning of the 1990s similar to Gerbrandy Tower a guyed steel tube mast on its top. This mast carried the FM- and TV-broadcasting aerials.

Nowadays this mast is demounted and there are only small aerials for mobile phone services on its top. The tower is nicknamed because of its cylindrical form "thermos flask".

The transmission tower built in 1974 is a  freestanding steel tube tower on three feet. This tower which is similar to the tower of transmitter Brocken, which was built at the same time, carries above its legs three platforms for aerials for directional radio services and in its topmost section, protected by layers of glass-reinforced plastic, transmission aerials for FM broadcasting services and TV.

Signals transmitted from Inselsberg

Analogue television
ARD  (originally DFF1), VHF channel E5 (Horizontal) 100 kW
MDR 3rd Programme  (originally DFF2), UHF channel 31 (Horizontal) 500 kW

FM radio
MDR 1,  92.5 MHz
MDR 2,  90.2 MHz
MDR 3,  87.9 MHz

See also
 List of towers
 A Tower

External links
 
 
 http://www.skyscraperpage.com/diagrams/?b46970
 http://www.skyscraperpage.com/cities/?buildingID=46971

Radio masts and towers in Germany
Buildings and structures in Gotha (district)
1939 establishments in Germany
Towers completed in 1939
Towers completed in 1974